The Bureau of Steam Engineering was a bureau of the United States Navy, created by the act of 5 July 1862, receiving some of the duties of the former Bureau of Construction, Equipment and Repair. It became, by the Naval Appropriation Act of 4 June 1920, the Bureau of Engineering (BuEng). In 1940 it combined with the Bureau of Construction and Repair (BuC&R) and became the Bureau of Ships (BuShips).

Historical background 
"Engineering, both in operating the shipboard machinery and in the design and construction of ships, became critically important with the outbreak of the Civil War. The Navy had to blockade a ‘coastline stretching over 3,000 miles from the Potomac to the Mexican border. It had to support the Army on the rivers; it had to search out and destroy Confederate raiders. For all these purposes, the steam engine and the engineer were indispensable. On the day of battle, steam engines drove the Monitor and the Merrimack, the Kearsarge and the Alabama, as well as the gunboats which supported Grant before Fort Donelson and Vicksburg. In 1862, Congress recognized the importance of engineering by creating the Bureau of Steam Engineering.

"When Lee surrendered, the United States Navy was the most effective sea power in the world. That position depended upon engineering which, in turn, was based on the skill of Benjamin F. Isherwood, first Chief of the Bureau of Steam Engineering. He designed and built engines rugged enough to withstand the shock of combat, as well as ill-treatment by poorly trained operating engineers. He also designed and constructed a well-armed cruiser which was faster than any abroad. In addition, American naval leadership rested upon ingenious civilian engineers and inventors such as John Ericsson, who designed and built the Monitor."

The Navy's first marine engineer was a civilian appointment in 1836.  Congress authorized the establishment of an Engineer Corps in 1842.  The 1862 reorganization gave officers of the Engineer Corps their own bureau with dedicated billets to avoid competition from Construction Corps officers (naval architects) in the separated Bureau of Construction and Repair.  In 1864 Congress authorized establishment of a separate United States Naval Academy curriculum for naval constructors and steam engineers; and the academy offered parallel tracks for cadet-midshipmen and cadet-engineers.  Shipboard commanding officers became uncomfortable with their increasing dependency on the skills and advice of subordinates trained in matters unfamiliar to them; so a common naval academy curriculum was re-instituted in 1882, and Engineer Corps officers were merged into the unrestricted line in 1899.  Junior Engineer Corps officers qualified for general line duties at sea, and senior Engineer Corps officers were restricted to shore assignments in their specialties.  The restricted line officer concept of "engineering duty only" (EDO) was revived in 1916 when the Engineer Corps officers proved inadequately prepared for the expanded shipbuilding programs of World War I.  The EDO designation expanded to include naval architects of the former Construction Corps when the two Corps were merged into the Bureau of Ships in 1940.

The consolidation with BuEng into BuShips had its origins when , first of the s to be delivered, was found to be heavier than designed and dangerously top-heavy in early 1939. It was determined that an underestimate by BuEng of the weight of a new machinery design was responsible, and that BuC&R did not have sufficient authority to detect or correct the error during the design process. Initially, Acting Secretary of the Navy Charles Edison proposed consolidation of the design divisions of the two bureaus. When the bureau chiefs could not agree on how to do this, he replaced both chiefs in September 1939. The consolidation was finally effected by a law passed by Congress on 20 June 1940.

Commanding officers 
Commanding and senior officers of the bureau were:

 1862–1869: Benjamin Franklin Isherwood, engineer-in-chief
 1869–1873: James Wilson King, engineer-in-chief
 1873–1877: William Willis Wood, engineer-in-chief
 1877–1883: William Henry Shock, commodore
 1883–1887: Charles Harding Loring, commodore
 1887–1903: George Wallace Melville, rear admiral
 1903–1908: Charles Whiteside Rae, rear admiral
 1908: John Kennedy Barton, rear admiral
 1909–1913: Hutch Ingham Cone, rear admiral
 1913–1921: Robert Stanislaus Griffin, rear admiral
 1921–1925: John Keeler Robison, rear admiral
 1925–1928: John Halligan Jr., rear admiral
 1928–1931: Harry Ervin Yarnell, rear admiral
 1931–1935: Samuel Murray Robinson, rear admiral
 1935–1939: Harold Gardiner Bowen Sr., rear admiral
 1939–1940: Samuel Murray Robinson, rear admiral

See also 
 Board of Navy Commissioners
 Bureau of Ships

References 
Citations

Bibliography
 Snyder, Philip W., RADM USN, (February 1979) "Bring Back the Corps", Proceedings of the United States Naval Institute

External links 
 
 

1862 establishments in the United States
1940 disestablishments in the United States
Steam Engineering
Engineering units and formations of the United States military
Marine engineering organizations
Military units and formations established in 1862
Military units and formations disestablished in 1940